The 2010 CSKA season was the 19th successive season that the club will play in the Russian Premier League, the highest tier of association football in Russia.

Squad

Out on loan

Transfers

In

Out

Loans out

Competitions

Russian Super Cup

UEFA Champions League

Knockout phase

Russian Premier League

Results by round

Results

League table

Russian Cup

Round 16 took place during the 2011–12 season.

Europa League

Play-off round

Group stage

Squad statistics

Appearances and goals

|-
|colspan="14"|Players away from the club on loan:
|-
|colspan="14"|Players who appeared for CSKA Moscow no longer at the club:

|}

Goal scorers

Disciplinary record

References

2010
CSKA Moscow
CSKA Moscow